Ithriyah-Raqqa offensive may refer to:
 Ithriyah-Raqqa offensive (February–March 2016)
 Ithriyah-Raqqa offensive (June 2016)